Rosario ("Rosary") is a 1935 Mexican drama film directed by Miguel Zacarías. It stars Gloria Morel  and Pedro Armendáriz on his silver screen debut.

Cast
Gloria Morel
Pedro Armendáriz
Natalia Ortiz
Jorge Treviño
Matilde Corell
Julio Taboada
Joaquín Coss
Fanny Schiller
Esther Fernández
Ismael Rodríguez
Rafael Icardo
Noemí Blanco
María Porras

External links 
 

1935 films
1930s Spanish-language films
Mexican black-and-white films
1935 drama films
Films directed by Miguel Zacarías
Mexican drama films
1930s Mexican films